Zalana is a commune in the Haute-Corse department of France on the island of Corsica.

Geography
Zalana is in the Castagniccia region of Corsica in the Moïta-Verde canton. The village is located on the east coast of the island 22 km from the sea by road. The connecting road ends in the village. It is situated on the mountainside at an altitude of 675m and has a view over the sea. Located in the south of the Castagniccia region, it is a quiet, rural village away from the busy coastal cities and their tourists. Many pleasant walks begin in the village, including one that takes you to a typical Genoese bridge.

Population

See also
Communes of the Haute-Corse department

References

Communes of Haute-Corse